Sarcolaena grandiflora is a species of plant in the Sarcolaenaceae family. It is endemic to Madagascar.  Its natural habitat is sandy shores. It is threatened by habitat loss.

References

Endemic flora of Madagascar
grandiflora
Taxonomy articles created by Polbot

Vulnerable flora of Africa